Peter of Candia, also known as Peter Phillarges (c. 1339 – May 3, 1410), named as Alexander V, was an antipope elected by the Council of Pisa during the Western Schism (1378–1417). He reigned briefly from June 26, 1409 to his death in 1410, in opposition to the Roman pope Gregory XII and the Avignon antipope Benedict XIII. In the 20th century, the Catholic Church reinterpreted the Western Schism by recognizing the Roman popes as legitimate. Gregory XII's reign was extended to 1415, and Alexander V is now regarded as an antipope.

Life
Alexander V was born near present-day Neapoli in Crete, then part of the Republic of Venice, in 1339. He was baptised Pietro Filargo, but is often known by the names Pietro di Candia and Peter Philarges.

He entered the Franciscan order, and his abilities were such that he was sent to study at the universities of Oxford and Paris. While he was in Paris the Western Schism occurred; Philarges supported Pope Urban VI (1378–89). He returned to Lombardy, where, thanks to the favour of Giangaleazzo Visconti, the Duke of Milan, he became bishop, first of Piacenza (1386), then of Vicenza (1387), then of Novara (1389), and finally Archbishop of Milan (1402).

On being created cardinal by Pope Innocent VII (1404–1406) in 1405, he devoted all his energies to the reunion of the Church, in spite of the two rival popes. He was one of the promoters of the Council of Pisa and his political maneuvers incurred the displeasure of Pope Gregory XII (1406–1415), who ordered Philarges deprived of both his dignities as archbishop and cardinal.

At the Council of Pisa (from March 25, 1409), the assembled cardinals elected Philarges to the Papal chair they had declared vacant. He was crowned on June 26, 1409, as Alexander V, making him in reality the third rival pontiff. Following his election, most polities in Europe recognised him as the true pontiff with the exceptions of the Kingdom of Aragon and Scotland, which remained loyal to the Avignon pope, and various Italian states, which adhered to the Roman pope.

During his ten-month reign, Alexander V's aim was to extend his obedience with the assistance of France, and, notably, of Duke Louis II of Anjou, upon whom he conferred the investiture of the Kingdom of Sicily, having removed it from Ladislaus of Naples. He proclaimed and promised rather than effected a certain number of reforms: the abandonment of the rights of "spoils" and "procurations", and the re-establishment of the system of canonical election in the cathedral churches and principal monasteries. He also gave out papal favours with a lavish hand, from which the mendicant orders benefitted especially.

Alexander V suddenly died while he was with Cardinal Baldassare Cossa at Bologna, on the night of 3–4 May 1410. His remains were placed in the church of St. Francis at Bologna. A rumour, though now considered false, spread that he had been poisoned by Cossa, who succeeded him as John XXIII (1410–1415).

Legacy
The Popes drinking society at Greyfriars, Oxford, is traditionally held to have been founded by Philarges during his time at the university. With the closure of Greyfriars in 2008, the society is now populated mainly by students of Regent's Park College, Oxford.

Traditionally, the Catholic Church considered Gregory XII's papacy to have ended in 1409 with the election of Alexander V. In 1958, Pope John XXIII selected the regnal number XXIII, citing "twenty-two [sic] Johns of indisputable legitimacy." Since the previous John XXIII (1410–1415) had succeeded Alexander V, the Pisan line became illegitimate. Gregory XII's papacy was extended to 1415, and Alexander V is now regarded by the Catholic Church as an antipope. Alexander V remains in the numbering sequence, since Rodrigo Borgia had already taken the name Alexander VI in 1492.

See also
 Papal selection before 1059
 Papal conclave (since 1274)

References

Sources
Artaud de Montor, Alexis François. The Lives and Times of the Popes. Volume 4 (New York: Catholic Publication Society of America, 1911), pp. 109-111.
 Frank,  J.W., "Die Obödienzerklärung des österreichischen Herzöge für Papst Alexander V. (1409)," , in: Römische Historische Mitteilungen, 20, 1978, pp. 49-76. 
 Gregorovius, Ferdinand. History of Rome in the Middle Ages. Volume VI. 2, second edition, revised (London: George Bell, 1906). [Book XII, chapter 5, pp. 598-612]. 
Kelly, J.N.D. & Walsh, M.J. Oxford Dictionary of Popes. second edition. Oxford: OUP 2010.

Pastor, Ludwig Freiherr von. The History of the Popes: From the Close of the Middle Ages. Volume 1, fifth edition.  Herder, 1923 [pp. 177-191]
 Petrucci, Armando. "Alessandro V, antipapa." . In: Enciclopedia dei Papi (2000).
 Tuilier, A. "L'élection d'Alexandre V, pape grec, sujet vénitien et docteur de l'Université de Paris," , in: Rivista di Studi Bizantini e Slavi, 3, 1983, pp. 319-341.
Valois, Noël. La France et le grand schisme d'Occident. Tome IV: Recours au Concile général.  Paris: A. Picard et fils, 1902. [pp. 102-129]

External links
The Peter of Candia Homepage

14th-century births
Year of birth uncertain
1410 deaths
14th-century Italian Roman Catholic bishops
15th-century Italian Roman Catholic bishops
Antipopes
Archbishops of Milan
Bishops of Novara
Bishops of Piacenza
Bishops of Vicenza
Franciscans
Greek popes
Greek cardinals
Greek religious leaders
University of Paris alumni
Western Schism
Burials at San Francesco (Bologna)
15th-century antipopes
15th-century cardinals
People from Lasithi
Republic of Venice expatriates in France
Republic of Venice expatriates in the Kingdom of England